The women's 10,000 metres at the 2015 Asian Athletics Championships was held on June 7.

Results

References

10000
10,000 metres at the Asian Athletics Championships
2015 in women's athletics